Macrochenus atkinsoni is a species of beetle in the family Cerambycidae. It was described by Charles Joseph Gahan in 1893. It is known from the Nicobar and Andaman Islands.

References

Lamiini
Beetles described in 1893